Josué Santos (1 July 1916 – 1 April 2007) was a Mexican basketball player. He competed in the men's tournament at the 1948 Summer Olympics.

References

1916 births
2007 deaths
Mexican men's basketball players
Olympic basketball players of Mexico
Basketball players at the 1948 Summer Olympics
Sportspeople from Ciudad Juárez
Basketball players from Chihuahua